Margarita Panova (born 31 January 1998) is a Moldovan footballer who plays as a forward and has appeared for the Moldova women's national team.

Career
Panova has been capped for the Moldova national team, appearing for the team during the 2019 FIFA Women's World Cup qualifying cycle.

See also
List of Moldova women's international footballers

References

External links
 
 
 

1998 births
Living people
Moldovan women's footballers
Women's association football forwards
Moldova women's international footballers
Moldovan expatriate women's footballers
Moldovan expatriate sportspeople in Romania
Expatriate women's footballers in Romania